Udryakbash (Öyźöräkbaş) is a rural locality (a selo) and the administrative centre of Udryakbashevsky Selsoviet, Blagovarsky District, Bashkortostan, Russia. The population was 540 as of 2010. There are 5 streets.

Geography 
Udryakbash is located 21 km south of Yazykovo (the district's administrative centre) by road. Yaparkul is the nearest rural locality.

References 

Rural localities in Blagovarsky District